Program, programme, programmer, or programming may refer to:

Business and management
 Program management, the process of managing several related projects
 Time management
 Program, a part of planning

Arts and entertainment

Audio
 Programming (music), generating music electronically
 Radio programming, act of scheduling content for radio
 Synthesizer programmer, a person who develops the instrumentation for a piece of music

Video or television
 Broadcast programming, scheduling content for television
 Program music, a type of art music that attempts to render musically an extra-musical narrative
 Synthesizer patch or program, a synthesizer setting stored in memory
 "Program", an instrumental song by Linkin Park from LP Underground Eleven
 Programmer, a film on the lower half of a double feature bill; see B-movie

Science and technology
 Computer program, a set of instructions that describes to a computer how to perform a specific task.
 Computer programming, the act of instructing computers to perform tasks
 Programming language, an artificial language designed to communicate instructions to a machine
 Game programming, the software development of video games
 Mathematical programming, or optimization, is the selection of a best element
 Programmer, a person who writes software
 Programmer (hardware), a physical device that configures electronic circuits
 Program (machine), a technical setting stored in the memory of a machine or piece of hardware to be executed, including computers.
 Research program, a professional network of scientists conducting basic research
 Software engineer, someone who participates in a software development process

Other uses
 Media Programme of the European Union
 Program (German non-profit), a project space in Berlin for art and architecture

See also
 Application software
 Deprogramming
 Dramatic programming, fictional television content
 Neuro-linguistic programming, a pseudoscientific method aimed at modifying human behavior
 Twelve-step program, a set of guiding principles for recovery from addiction, compulsion, or other behavioral problems
 The Program (disambiguation)